Prosartes hookeri is a North American species of flowering plants in the lily family known by the common names drops of gold and Hooker's fairy bells.

Distribution
It is native to western North America from Alberta and British Columbia to California to Montana, where it usually grows in shady, damp areas, such as forest understory. Additional populations have been found in the Black Hills of Wyoming and South Dakota as well as in the Porcupine Mountains in Michigan. A typical west coast habitat is in forest floors of California oak woodlands, where common understory flora associates may include Coastal woodfern, Dryopteris arguta; Maidenhair fern, Adiantum jordanii and False Solomon's seal, Maianthemum racemosum.

Description
It is an erect, few-branched perennial herb growing up to a meter tall from a rhizome. Its narrow, fuzzy stems bear wide, oval-shaped, pointed leaves up to 15 centimeters long and hairless to hairy, often with hairs along the edges and on the veins underneath. The inflorescence at the tips of branches produce one to three drooping, hanging flowers which may be hidden in the cover of the large leaves. The flower is bell-shaped with six white to green veiny tepals and six protruding stamens with large anthers. The fruit is an orange to bright red berry just under a centimeter wide.

References

External links

hookeri
Flora of North America
Plants described in 1857